The 2010 National Premier Soccer League season is the 8th season of the NPSL. The season began on April 3, 2010, and ended with the NPSL Championship Game in August.  The NPSL had planned for form a Winter league that would play from September 2010 to March 2011 but when only three clubs were willing to participate the plans were dropped.  Those three clubs eventually ended up forming the SPSL for that Fall, though that league would fold the following Spring.

Changes from 2009

New clubs 
Twelve clubs joined the league this year, eleven new clubs and one returning to the NPSL after playing for several years in USASA regional amateur leagues:

Name changes
Pennsylvania Stoners changed its name to FC Sonic Lehigh Valley

Folding
Eight teams left the league prior to the beginning of the season:
Boston Aztec - Amesbury, Massachusetts
Buffalo City - Buffalo, New York
Charm City - Gambrills, Maryland
FC Indiana - Lafayette, Indiana
Maine Sting - Bangor, Maine
NorCal Lamorinda United - Orinda, California
Salinas Valley Samba - Watsonville, California
Saturn FC - East Point, Georgia
Also, four teams which spent the 2009 season on hiatus did not return, and left the league permanently:
Albuquerque Asylum - Albuquerque, New Mexico
Arizona Sahuaros - Phoenix, Arizona
Atlantic City Diablos - Richland, New Jersey
San Diego United - El Cajon, California

Standings
Purple indicates division title clinched
Green indicates playoff berth clinched

Northeast Keystone Division

Northeast Atlantic Division

Southeast Division

Midwest Division

Northwest Division

Playoffs

Northeast Division Playoff
FC Sonic Lehigh Valley beat New York Red Bull NPSL

Northwest Division Playoffs
Sacramento Gold 6-3 Bay Area Ambassadors
San Diego Boca 4-0 Real San Jose

Sacramento Gold beat San Diego Boca

National Semi-Finals
Sacramento Gold 4-1 FC Sonic Lehigh Valley
Chattanooga FC 2-0 Madison 56ers

Third Place Playoff
FC Sonic Lehigh Valley 3-1 Madison 56ers

NPSL Championship Game
Sacramento Gold 3-1 Chattanooga FC

References

2010
4